Anagaudryceras is an extinct genus of ammonite from the later Cretaceous belonging to the Ammonoidea family Gaudryceratidae.  Anagaudryceras has a moderately involute shell with a deep umbilicus and strongly ribbed outer whorl. Ribs are thick and rounded and cross over the venter uninterrupted.

References
 
 Wani, R. 2007. Differential preservation of the Upper Cretaceous ammonoid Anagaudryceras limatum with corrugated shell in central Hokkaido, Japan. Acta Palaeontologica Polonica 52 (1) 2007 
 The Paleobiology Datase Anagaudriceras entry accessed 5 April 2012

Lytoceratina
Ammonites of Europe
Ammonites of Australia
Cretaceous ammonites of North America
Albian genus first appearances
Cenomanian genera
Turonian genera
Coniacian genera
Santonian genera
Campanian genera
Maastrichtian genus extinctions